The Bind are a caste found in Uttar Pradesh, Bihar, Madhya Pradesh, Assam, West Bengal, Chhattisgarh and Tripura. Bind are under the OBC category of the central list. In Uttar Pradesh, they are known by the Kewat sub-caste.

Present circumstances
The Bind are among 17 Other Backwards Class communities that have been proposed for Scheduled Caste status by the Samajwadi Party-controlled Government of Uttar Pradesh. However, this proposal, which relates to votebank politics and has been made in the past, has been stayed by the courts; a prior attempt was also rejected by the Centre.

The Bind have a traditional caste council and, like other occupational castes, maintain strict social control over members. They are Hindu, and customs similar to other similar groupings such as the Kewat. They are concentrated in eastern Uttar Pradesh, and speak Bhojpuri.

In Bihar, the Jethaut are mainly engaged in fishing, well sinking and basket making, while the Kharaut are mainly farmers. They speak the Maithili dialect of Hindi.

References

Further reading

Indian castes
Other Backward Classes of Uttar Pradesh
Other Backward Classes of Rajasthan
Other Backward Classes of West Bengal
Scheduled Castes of Madhya Pradesh
Scheduled Castes of Assam